The president of the House of Councillors of Morocco is the presiding officer of that body. From the creation of the House of Councillors in 1997, it is the upper house of the Parliament of Morocco.

List

References 
 Official website of the House of Councillors of Morocco (in Arabic)

Politics of Morocco
Morocco, Assembly of Councillors
Presidents of the House of Councillors
Political office-holders in Morocco